Vasyl Ihorovych Tsyutsyura (born 26 February 1994) is a Ukrainian professional footballer who plays as a centre-forward for Ukrainian club Prykarpattia Ivano-Frankivsk.

References

External links
 Profile on Prykarpattia Ivano-Frankivsk official website
 

1994 births
Living people
Ukrainian footballers
Association football forwards
FC Skala Stryi (2004) players
FC Stal Kamianske players
FC Naftovyk-Ukrnafta Okhtyrka players
FC Prykarpattia Ivano-Frankivsk (1998) players
Ukrainian First League players
Ukrainian Second League players